Fatal accidents to competitors at the Autódromo Juan y Oscar Gálvez, in Buenos Aires, Argentina  during the 1000 km Buenos Aires and other national and international motor-sport events.

Eric Forrest-Greene died in the 1954 1000 km Buenos Aires, and Jorge Magnasco died in 1958 1000 km Buenos Aires, though they are not included because their accidents occurred on Avenida General Paz (the track was mixed).

List of fatal accidents involving competitors

List of fatal accidents involving race officials

List of fatal accidents involving spectators

References 

Lists of motorsport fatalities
Motorcycle sport lists